Acidification may refer to:

 Ocean acidification, decrease in the pH of the Earth's oceans
 Freshwater acidification, atmospheric depositions and soil leaching of SOx and NOx
 Soil acidification, buildup of hydrogen cations, which reduces the soil pH
 Souring, a cooking technique